Stona Fitch is an American novelist, best known for his 2001 book, Senseless, which was turned into the 2008 movie, Senseless, directed by Symon Hynd. Fitch graduated with an A.B. in English from Princeton University in 1983 after completing an 137-page-long senior thesis titled "Luxury You Can Afford - Ten Stories."

Bibliography
Give and Take (2010) - the first book published by Concord Free Press.
Printer's  Devil (2009, Free Raven Press).
Senseless (2001, SoHo Press) - cinematized as Senseless (2008 film).
Strategies for Success (1992, G.B. Putnam's  Sons).

References

External links
 Official website
 Poets & Writers listing
 Washington Post (May 27, 2009): "Radical Business Plan:  Free Books"
 Jenny Brown Associates listing

Living people
Year of birth missing (living people)
Place of birth missing (living people)
21st-century American novelists
Princeton University alumni
American male novelists
21st-century American male writers